The Western Reserve Historical Society (WRHS) is a historical society in Cleveland, Ohio. The society operates the Cleveland History Center, a collection of museums in University Circle.

The society was founded in 1867, making it the oldest cultural institution in Northeast Ohio. WRHS is focused on the history of the Western Reserve. WRHS celebrated its 150th anniversary in 2017.

Location and mission 
The Western Reserve & Northern Ohio Historical Society formed in 1867, initially as a branch of the Cleveland Library Association. Its first president was Charles Whittlesey, "a geologist and historian". "Originally, the society was located on the third floor of the Society for Savings Bank in downtown Cleveland." The institution first opened to the public in 1871 and purchased the entire bank building in 1892 due to the increasing size of the collections. From 1898 until 1938 the society resided at E. 107th St. and Euclid Avenue. WRHS moved to its present location in the late 1930s.

Located in University Circle, an arts and culture district of Cleveland, the Society houses and curates collections of cultural artifacts and documents from various people. The mission of the Western Reserve Historical Society is "to inspire people to discover the American experience by exploring the tangible history of Northeast Ohio." This is accomplished by collecting, preserving and presenting the history of all the people of the Western Reserve. WRHS is a private, membership-based society that also receives funding through investments, grants, and gifts.

History 
"Founded in May 1867, the Western Reserve Historical Society is Cleveland's oldest existing cultural institution. It was established as the historical branch of the Cleveland Library Association which dated from 1848. The Society's creation was part of an important trend in the United States, the establishment of private organizations to oversee the collection and preservation of documents and objects relating to various aspects of national, regional and local history. While its original focus was on the history of "...Cleveland and the Western Reserve, and generally what relates to the history of Ohio and the Great West," it now concentrates on the history of Northeast Ohio."

"Between 1867 and 1898, the Society was located in downtown Cleveland in a building which stood on what is now Key Tower, the site of the KeyBank headquarters. During this period the Society's collections grew rapidly as did its means of support as leading citizens, including John D. Rockefeller, collectors, and scholars became associated with its operations. The growth and stature of its collections were such that it obtained a charter from the State of Ohio on March 7, 1892 which made it an independent organization, one on a par with other major cultural and educational institutions that had arisen in the post-Civil War period."

"In 1898 the Society moved to the University Circle area, occupying a large new building that was situated at the southeast corner of the intersection of Euclid Avenue and what is now Stokes Boulevard. It remained there until 1938 when it began a move to its current location on East Boulevard with its acquisition of the Hay-McKinney mansion to house its museum. Today, the Cleveland History Center houses the Research Library, the Crawford Auto Aviation Museum, the Chisholm Halle Costume Wing (home to fashion exhibits), two historic mansions, Kidzibits Family Hands-on Gallery, as well as its administrative offices."

"In 1957, WRHS received the Jonathan Hale homestead in Bath, Ohio and now operates the 90 acres of Hale Farm & Village, a living history museum depicting life in the 19th century through agricultural practices and everyday craft and trade demonstrations such as glassblowing, pottery, spinning and weaving, and more."

"The physical and geographic expansion of the Society's facilities was complemented by increased professionalism of its curatorial operations and an important topical expansion of its collections. Beginning in the late 1960s the Society began aggressive programs to acquire and preserve documents and artifacts that represented the histories of Northeast Ohio's diverse populations. Specific programs were established in African-American, Jewish, Italian, Irish, LGBT, labor, and other areas of community history which have provided it with unparalleled resources relating to urban, industrial, immigration, and family history. These provide a critical complement to its collections on the pioneer settlement and early growth of the Western Reserve as well as to major topics such as the American Civil War, decorative arts, genealogy, and automotive and aviation history."

"By the early 1980s, the Western Reserve Historical Society had become one of the largest private historical societies in the United States. In 1986, its library contained approximately 250,000 books and six million manuscript items."

Cleveland History Center
The Society's headquarters in University Circle, styled "the History Center", houses several facilities:
 The Crawford Auto-Aviation Museum houses over 150 vintage and antique automobiles and airplanes.
 The Euclid Beach Park Grand Carousel (PTC #19), originally built in 1910 by the Philadelphia Toboggan Company and fully restored 45 years after the park closed, opened November 23, 2014.
 The History Museum also has changing exhibits that showcase local history.
 The History Museum also includes:
 The Hay-McKinney Mansion, a 1911 home with luxurious turn-of-the-century parlors and living areas designed by Abram Garfield, the son of James A. Garfield.
 The Bingham-Hanna House, built between 1916 and 1919 on the land neighboring the Hay-McKinney property, Harry Payne Bingham built a 35-room house designed by Walker & Gillette, with a landscape by Olmsted Brothers and featuring ironwork by Samuel Yellin.
 The Chisholm Halle Costume Wing, houses over 30,000 garments from the late 18th century to the present.
 The Library and Archives feature over 20 million archives and manuscripts for genealogical research or any aspect of Northeast Ohio history. The institutions significant collections includes the World's largest and most comprehensive collection of Shaker Materials. Other substantial collections include the Civil War and the automotive industry.

Hale Farm and Village 
Located in Bath, Ohio, Hale Farm & Village, a museum of the Western Reserve Historical Society (WRHS) is a "living history museum depicting life in the 19th century through agricultural practices and everyday craft and trade demonstrations such as glassblowing, pottery, spinning and weaving, and more."

Hale Farm's core mission is education, a place where the past is brought to life through a combination of living history experiences, historic architecture, domestic craft and trade demonstrations, farming and heritage gardens.

Hale Farm & Village depicts rural life in the Western Reserve through the experiences of three generations of Hales, from pioneer Jonathan Hale's arrival in 1810 through the bequest of the family farm to WRHS by his great granddaughter, Clara Belle Ritchie, in 1956. Her will directed WRHS to "establish The Hale Farm as a museum, open to the public to the end that the greatest number of persons may be informed as to the history and culture of the Western Reserve." In 1973, The Hale Farm was listed on the National Register of Historic Places as the Jonathan Hale Homestead.

Located in the heart of the Cuyahoga Valley National Park, Hale Farm & Village is the ultimate outdoor classroom with thirty-two historic structures, heritage breeds of livestock, gardens and crop fields, costumed staff, early American craft and trade demonstrations, and a year-round calendar of educational and public programs and community events that explore the rich, rural American experience in the Western Reserve.

Hale Farm Structures:
 Jonathan Hale House
 "Built by Jonathan Hale between 1825 and 1827, this three-story brick house was one of only two all-brick buildings in the Cuyahoga Valley at the time of its construction. Jonathan's father and grandfather built his ancestral home in Glastonbury with bricks shaped and burned on site; therefore, it is not surprising that Jonathan brought that family tradition to the Western Reserve."
 Jonathan Goldsmith House
 The Jonathan Goldsmith House was built for the William Peck Robinson family, ca. 1830 in Willoughby, Ohio. The building is named for its builder and architect  Jonathan Gillett Goldsmith (1784-1847). Goldsmith is recognized as one of the finest architects in the Reserve. His structures featured elaborate carvings and high quality construction. This house is an excellent example of his work. Because of the size and quality of the craftsmanship, the Goldsmith House stands today as the finest and most luxurious house in the Village.
 Fritch Log Cabin
 Log Smoke House
 Sugar House
 Sawmill
 The John A. McAlonan Carriage Manufactor
 The Stow House
 The Saltbox House
 The Jagger House
 Schoolhouse
 The Land Office
 The Mary Ann Sears Swetland Memorial Meetinghouse
 The Wade Law Office
 The Jonathan E. Herrick House
 The Aten Log Barn
Hale Farm Crafts and Trades
 Potter
 Glasswork
 Blacksmith
 Spinning and Weaving
 Basket Making
 Broom Making
 Candle Making

Other properties
 Shandy Hall, located in Geneva, Ohio, was constructed in 1815 by Col. Robert Harper, a son of Alexander Harper, namesake of the township and the first permanent settler in that area. Built in 1815, Shandy Hall is an example of early life and architecture found in the Western Reserve. Shandy Hall is under preservation and is not currently available for public visitation.
 Loghurst, built in 1805 in Canfield, Ohio, is thought to be the oldest residence in the Western Reserve.  Loghurst continues to be part of the WRHS Collection of historic buildings and properties. Today, the Canfield Heritage Foundation maintains the property and public operation. Canfield Heritage Foundation offers additional information.
 The society also owned and operated Lawnfield, President James A. Garfield's home in Mentor, Ohio, from 1936, when it was donated by the Garfield family, until 2008, when it was turned over to the National Park Service.

References

External links

 
 Encyclopedia of Cleveland History

Museums in Cleveland
History museums in Ohio
University Circle
Historic house museums in Ohio
Textile museums in the United States
Historical society museums in Ohio
Libraries in Ohio
Historical societies in Ohio
Western Reserve, Ohio